Dauphin—Swan River—Marquette (formerly known as Dauphin and Dauphin—Swan River) was a federal electoral district in Manitoba, Canada, that was represented in the House of Commons of Canada from 1904 to 2015. Its population in 2011 was 74,800. The riding became known as Dauphin—Swan River—Neepawa for the 2015 federal election.

Demographics
According to the Canada 2011 Census

Languages: 83% English, 2.03% French, 14.97% Other

According to the Canada 2006 Census
Racial groups: 75.02% White, 24.21% Aboriginal 
Average income: $16,388 
Religions (2001): 47.30% Protestant, 32.18% Catholic, 14.45% Non religious, 3.27% Christian Orthodox, 1.99% Other Christian

Riding associations

Riding associations are the local branches of the national political parties:

Geography
The riding was located in between southern and central Manitoba, west of Lake Winnipegosis and Lake Manitoba.

History
The electoral district was created as "Dauphin" riding in 1903 from Macdonald, Marquette and Saskatchewan (Provisional District) ridings.

In 1983, it was renamed "Dauphin–Swan River".

In 2004, it was renamed "Dauphin–Swan River–Marquette".

Members of Parliament

The riding elected the following Members of Parliament:

Last Member of Parliament
The seat was last held by Robert Sopuck, a fisheries biologist. When the riding became known as Dauphin—Swan River—Neepawa, Sopuck handily won the election.

Election results
Dauphin—Swan-River—Marquette was a conservative riding for much of the last half-century of its existence.  It was held by the Liberals from 1993–1997, with that party's sweeping victory in the 1993 general election. The only other time that it was not represented by a centre-right party after 1958 was from 1980 to 1984, when it was held by the NDP.

Dauphin—Swan River—Marquette, 2004–present

2010 by-election

Dauphin—Swan River, 1983–2004

^  Change is from the total of Progressive Conservative and Canadian Alliance votes in the 2000 election.

|-

Note: Canadian Alliance vote is compared to Reform Party vote in 1997 election.

|-

|-

|align="left" colspan=2|Liberal gain from Progressive Conservative
|align="right"|Swing
|align="right"| -18.85
|align="right"|

Dauphin, 1904–1983

Note: NDP vote is compared to CCF vote in 1958 election.

See also
 Swan River (electoral district)
 Dauphin, Manitoba
 Swan River, Manitoba
 Neepawa, Manitoba
 Minnedosa, Manitoba
 List of Canadian federal electoral districts
 Past Canadian electoral districts

References

 
 
 Expenditures -2008
Expenditures - 2004
Expenditures - 2000
Expenditures - 1997
Notice of vacancy - Dauphin-Swan River-Marquette, Elections Canada, September 16, 2010
2010 by-elections results from Elections Canada

Notes

Dauphin, Manitoba
Former federal electoral districts of Manitoba